Herman Pitz    (July 18, 1865 – September 3, 1924) was a 19th-century Major League Baseball player. Primarily a catcher, he also played third base and outfield with the Syracuse Stars and Brooklyn Gladiators of the  American Association in 1890. He remained active in minor league baseball through 1895.

External links
Baseball-Reference page

1865 births
1924 deaths
19th-century baseball players
Major League Baseball catchers
Syracuse Stars (AA) players
Brooklyn Gladiators players
Elmira Hottentots players
Elmira Gladiators players
Binghamton Bingos players
Scranton Miners players
Hazleton Quay-kers players
Elmira Pioneers players
Baseball players from New York (state)
Burials at the Cemetery of the Evergreens